Wanamassa  is an unincorporated community and census-designated place (CDP) within Ocean Township, in Monmouth County, New Jersey, United States. As of the 2010 United States Census, the CDP's population was 4,532. The community was named for Wanamassa, a Native American leader of the 17th century.

Geography
According to the United States Census Bureau, the CDP had a total area of 1.152 square miles (2.982 km2), including 1.114 square miles (2.885 km2) of land and 0.038 square miles (0.098 km2) of water (3.27%).

Demographics

Census 2010

Census 2000
As of the 2000 United States Census there were 4,551 people, 1,657 households, and 1,277 families living in the CDP. The population density was 1,568.9/km2 (4,051.4/mi2). There were 1,701 housing units at an average density of 586.4/km2 (1,514.3/mi2). The racial makeup of the CDP was 94.24% White, 1.27% African American, 0.13% Native American, 2.83% Asian, 0.18% Pacific Islander, 0.46% from other races, and 0.88% from two or more races. Hispanic or Latino of any race were 2.99% of the population.

There were 1,657 households, out of which 39.2% had children under the age of 18 living with them, 62.3% were married couples living together, 11.3% had a female householder with no husband present, and 22.9% were non-families. 18.6% of all households were made up of individuals, and 8.4% had someone living alone who was 65 years of age or older. The average household size was 2.75 and the average family size was 3.15.

In the CDP the population was spread out, with 26.5% under the age of 18, 5.9% from 18 to 24, 30.1% from 25 to 44, 24.5% from 45 to 64, and 13.0% who were 65 years of age or older. The median age was 38 years. For every 100 females, there were 94.3 males. For every 100 females age 18 and over, there were 90.4 males.

The median income for a household in the CDP was $61,607, and the median income for a family was $64,960. Males had a median income of $51,768 versus $35,000 for females. The per capita income for the CDP was $26,759. About 0.9% of families and 1.6% of the population were below the poverty line, including 1.5% of those under age 18 and none of those age 65 or over.

Transportation
New Jersey Transit offers train service on the North Jersey Coast Line at the Allenhurst and Asbury Park stations. NJ Transit local bus service is available on the 832 and 837 routes.

Notable people

People who were born in, residents of, or otherwise closely associated with Wanamassa include:
 Bruce Springsteen (born 1949), musician.

References

Census-designated places in Monmouth County, New Jersey
Ocean Township, Monmouth County, New Jersey
New Jersey placenames of Native American origin